Eupithecia mesodeicta is a moth in the  family Geometridae. It is found in Pakistan and India.

References

Moths described in 1938
mesodeicta
Moths of Asia